FirstBank Holding Company (or 1stBank) is an American privately held bank and financial services company that operates more than 100 locations in three states in the Southwestern U.S., in Colorado, Arizona, and California. Founded in 1963, it is headquartered in Lakewood, Colorado.

History
FirstBank was founded by George and Everett Williams in Lakewood, Colorado, in 1963 as the First Westland National Bank. The Williams were joined on the founding board by Ira C. Rothgerber Jr. and William Johnson, both from the Denver law firm Rothgerber, Appel and Powers (now Lewis Roca). Roger Reisher became the founding president of the bank and remained at the position for the first 36 years of the bank's history.

By the 1970s, the company had grown to include a number of additional Colorado locations including banks in Vail and Wheat Ridge. In 1978, the organization consolidated under its current name, FirstBank. In 1985, the bank opened its first location outside Colorado in Palm Desert, California. FirstBank expanded to Arizona in 2007.

Operations 
FirstBank is a member of the Federal Deposit Insurance Corporation, often styled as Member FDIC. It has its headquarters at 12345 W. Colfax Avenue in Lakewood, Colorado. In June 2016, the organization completed an addition to its facilities that expanded it to a 227,000-square-foot campus that could accommodate up to 1,400 employees. In February 2020, FirstBank opened its Multicultural Banking Center in Lakewood to provide banking services in languages such as Spanish, Chinese, Mandarin Chinese, Korean, Vietnamese and Cantonese.

Philanthropy 
In 2010, FirstBank partnered with Community First Foundation to launch Colorado Gives Day – a 24-hour online drive to raise funds for Colorado nonprofits. Gives Day expanded beyond Colorado, in 2013, with the implementation of Arizona Gives Day – a collaboration between Alliance of Arizona Nonprofits and Arizona Grantmakers Forum. As of December 2021, Colorado Gives Day had raised $361 million for Colorado nonprofits. FirstBank received the 2016 Corporate Citizenship award from Governor John Hickenlooper.

See also
 1stBank Center

References

External links 

 

Companies based in Lakewood, Colorado
Banks based in Colorado
Economy of the Southwestern United States
1963 establishments in Colorado
Banks established in 1963
American companies established in 1963